Fabiania is a genus of moths of the family Noctuidae.

Species
 Fabiania pulla Hreblay & Ronkay, 2000

References
Natural History Museum Lepidoptera genus database
Fabiania at funet 

Cuculliinae